Chionanthus balgooyana grows as a tree up to  tall, with a trunk diameter of up to . The bark is greyish green or dark brown. The flowers are white or greenish white. C. balgooyana is endemic to the Sarawak region of Malaysian Borneo.

References

balgooyana
Endemic flora of Borneo
Trees of Borneo
Flora of Sarawak
Plants described in 2002